Vale View is a rural locality in the Toowoomba Region, Queensland, Australia.

Geography 
The Southern railway line marks a small section of the northwest boundary of Vale View.  The New England Highway is aligned with the southeast boundary.

Shepperd is a neighbourhood around the former Shepperd railway station on the Southern railway line.

There is an area of rural residential development in the north of the locality on the southern slope of Mount Shepperd. The rest of the locality is used for a mixture of cropping and grazing on native vegetation.

History 
The name Shepperd is a railway station name, assigned by the Queensland Railways Department on 29 April 1915. The name was suggested by the Drayton Shire Council after Samuel Shepperd, the manager of Glengallan pastoral property.

In December 1930, tenders were called to relocate the Pickanjinnie school building to Vale View. Vale View State School opened on 2 March 1931.

Education 
Vale View State School is a government primary (Prep-6) school for boys and girls at 873 Drayton Connection Road. In 2018, the school had an enrolment of 86 students with 7 teachers (6 full-time equivalent) and 9 non-teaching staff (4 full-time equivalent).

There is no secondary school in Vale View. The nearest secondary schools are Harristown State High School in Harristown to the north and Centenary Heights State High School in Centenary Heights to the north-east, both of them in Toowoomba.

References

Suburbs of Toowoomba
Localities in Queensland